This is a list of notable Sri Lankan musicians (music artists and bands) from all genres.

The musicians/bands are listed according to the alphabetical order by first name.



A 
Ajith Bandara
Allen Ratnayake
Amarasiri Peiris
Ananda Samarakone
Annesley Malewana
Anton Jones
Anil Mihiripenna
Athma Liyanage

B 
Bathiya Jaykody

C 
Ceylon Manohar
C.T. Fernando
Chandrasena Hettiarachchi
Chandralekha Perera
Chitral Somapala
Clarence Wijewardane
Cliff Foenander

D 
Dasun Madushan
Desmond de Silva
Dinesh Subasinghe
Dhanith Sri
Dushyanth Weeraman

E 
Eddie Jayamanne
Edward Jayakody

F 
Freddie Silva

G 
Gresha Schuilling
Gunadasa Kapuge
Mohammed Gauss
The Gypsies

H 
H. R. Jothipala
Henry Caldera

I 
Iraj Weeraratne
Indrachapa Liyanage

J 
J. P. Chandrababu
J. A. Milton Perera
Jackson Anthony
Jagath Wickramasinghe

K 
Kamal Addararachchi
Karunarathna Divulgane
Kasun Kalhara
Keerthi Pasquel
Kumar Navaratnam
Keith Potger

L 
Lahiru Perera
Lakshman Joseph De Saram
Latha Walpola
La Bambas
Lionel Ranwala

M 
Mariazelle Goonetilleke
Mathangi Arulpragasam
Mercy Edirisinghe
Mignonne Fernando
Milton Mallawarachchi
Mohideen Baig
The Moonstones
M. S. Fernando

N 
Nuwandhika Senarathne
Nadeeka Guruge
Namal Udugama
Nanda Malini
Narada Disasekara
Neela Wickramasinghe
Nimal Mendis
Nihal Nelson
Nalin Jayawardena
Nirosha Virajini

P 
Pandith Amaradeva
Paranoid Earthling
Paul Fernando
Premasiri Khemadasa
Priya Suriyasena
Prince Udaya Priyantha

R 
R. Muttusamy
Ravi Kesavaram
Rohan de Saram
Rookantha Gunathilake
Rukmani Devi
Rukshan Perera
Rohana Weerasinghe
Ranidu Lankage

S 
Sadiris Master
Saheli Rochana Gamage
Sanath Nandasiri
Santhush Weeraman
Shihan Mihiranga
Sisira Senaratne
Som Wardner
Stanley Peiris
Stigmata
Sunflowers
Sunil Edirisinghe
Sujatha Aththanayaka
Sunil Perera
Sunil Santha
Sahan Ranwala

T 
T. M. Jayaratne
Tanya Ekanayaka
Tariq Hisny
Tharanga Goonetilleke

U 
 Umaria Sinhawansa
 Upali Kannangara

V 
Victor Ratnayake
Vijaya Kumaranatunga
Vivienne de Silva Boralessa

W 
W. D. Amaradeva

Y 
Yolande Bavan

References 

 
Musicians
Sri Lankan